Port Krym (- literally Port Crimea) is a port in Crimea. It is located on the western shore of Kerch Strait, in the north-eastern part of Kerch city near a settlement of Zhukivka. Next to the port is located the Krym railway station.

Port Krym had the Kerch Strait ferry connection with Port Kavkaz on the eastern (Russian) shore of the strait. The port is also a base for pilot boats which guide navigation through the Strait of Kerch. The port is served by a fleet of three ships which were the property of the Ukrainian State Company "Kerch Ferry" as well as two more ships of the Russian company "ANShIP" which provides railroad ferry connection.

Port Krym was a transition point on the E97 (M17) where it terminated and resumed on the Russian coast at the Port Kavkaz. The type of crossing was ferry, status - local. The types of transportation crossings were passenger and freight.

References

External links
 Ukrmorrichflot State Administration website (archived)

Kerch Peninsula
Krym
Geography of Crimea
Buildings and structures in Kerch
1954 establishments in Ukraine
Russia–Ukraine border crossings
Kerch Strait
Ports of Crimea
Sanctioned due to Russo-Ukrainian War
Enterprises of Kerch